Thermus igniterrae is a bacterium belonging to the Deinococcota phylum, known to be present in hazardous conditions. This species was identified in Iceland, together with Thermus antranikianii.

References

External links
Type strain of Thermus igniterrae at BacDive -  the Bacterial Diversity Metadatabase

Deinococcota
Bacteria described in 2000